Grigora I Ora Perase (The Time Passed Quickly) is an album by popular Greek artist Eleftheria Arvanitaki and it was released in 2006. On it, Eleftheria performs the songs that the composer wrote based on poetry mainly by Sappho. The album sold 15,000 copies in Greece and was certified Gold 4 weeks after its release.

Track listing 
"Grigora I Ora Perase" (Instrumental)
"Athanati Afroditi"
"Theos Mou Fainetai"
"O Adonis"
"Polles Fores"
"Os Astra Gyro Vriskontai"
"Na 'Cha Pethanei"
"Pyretos Kryfos"
"Ti Thelo Ti"
"Grigora I Ora Perase"
"Afroditi"
"Ilisos"
"Iridanos"
"Einai Poly Noris"
"To Teleftaio Taxidi"

References

2006 albums
Eleftheria Arvanitaki albums
Greek-language albums
Universal Music Greece albums
Adaptations of works by Sappho